Philadelphia International Records (PIR) was an American record label based in Philadelphia, Pennsylvania. It was founded in 1971 by songwriting and production duo Kenneth Gamble and Leon Huff along with their longtime collaborator Thom Bell. It was known for showcasing the Philadelphia soul music genre (also known as Philly soul) that was founded on the gospel, doo-wop and soul music of the time. This sound later marked a prominent and distinct era within the R&B genre. During the 1970s, the label released a string of worldwide hits that emphasized lavish orchestral instrumentation, heavy bass and driving percussion.

Some of their most popular and best selling acts included the O'Jays, Harold Melvin & the Blue Notes, Teddy Pendergrass, MFSB, Billy Paul, Patti LaBelle and Lou Rawls. Between 1971 and the early 1980s, the label released more than 170 gold and platinum records.

Philadelphia International Records had been mostly defunct since 1987 and finally shut down in 2001. As of 2007, Sony Music Entertainment owns all rights to the Philadelphia International Records catalogue.

Beginning and success
Kenneth Gamble and Leon Huff, the founders of Philadelphia International Records, met in 1964 while they were both playing as session musicians for various labels, including Philadelphia based Cameo-Parkway Records, whose building would later become home to Philadelphia International Records' recording studio. In 1965, Huff joined Gamble's band, the Romeos, a popular moniker at the time, by replacing future Philadelphia International Records producer and arranger Thom Bell on piano. Gamble and the Romeos had seen little success playing for their label, Arctic Records, and split up soon after.

When the Romeos disbanded, Gamble and Huff went on to start one of the first iterations of Philadelphia International Records (which they named Excel and Gamble) after a visit to Motown Records in Detroit to scope out the Motown setup. The success of their biggest signing, the Intruders, brought attention to Gamble and Huff, which allowed them to create Neptune Records in 1969. Neptune Records, a more ambitious project for the duo, was financed by Chess Records, and allowed them to sign later Philadelphia International Records artists the O'Jays and the Three Degrees. When Chess Records changed ownership in 1969, Neptune Records folded. With the collapse of Neptune Records, Gamble and Huff transferred their signed artists to a new project, Philadelphia International Records. Looking to attract new black acts to their label, but without the in-house knowhow, Columbia Records was convinced to sign an exclusive production contract with Gamble and Huff's new Philadelphia International Records.

The label was set up in connection with Mighty Three/Assorted Music, the music publishing company run by Gamble, Huff and another Philadelphia producer, Thom Bell, to showcase their songs.

The label's major hits included: "TSOP (The Sound of Philadelphia)" by MFSB, featuring the Three Degrees, 1974 (which was later used as one of the theme tunes for the TV dance-music show Soul Train); "Ain't No Stoppin' Us Now" by McFadden & Whitehead (writers and producers with the label), 1979; "Back Stabbers" and "Love Train" by the O'Jays, 1972/3; "If You Don't Know Me By Now" and "The Love I Lost" by Harold Melvin & the Blue Notes, 1972/3; "Me and Mrs. Jones" by Billy Paul, 1972; "When Will I See You Again" by the Three Degrees, 1974; and "You'll Never Find Another Love Like Mine" by Lou Rawls, 1976.

The label had a distribution deal with CBS Records until 1984. Distribution of the catalog from 1976 onward was taken over by EMI Records, but CBS continued to distribute material recorded up to 1976. In 2007, Sony's Legacy Recordings regained the rights to Philadelphia International's full catalog and the following year, PIR/Legacy released a box set titled Love Train: The Sound of Philadelphia.

Most of the music released by the label was recorded and produced at Sigma Sound Studios in Philadelphia, with chief engineer and later studio owner Joe Tarsia recording many of the sessions. More than 30 resident studio musicians, known collectively as MFSB ("Mother Father Sister Brother"), were based at this studio and backed up most of the recordings. Some of these musicians also acted as arrangers, writers or producers for Philadelphia International as well as for other labels recording in the city. They included Bobby Martin, Norman Harris, Thom Bell, Ronnie Baker, Vince Montana and, later, Jack Faith and John Usry.

Gamble and Huff worked as independent producers with a series of artists in the late 1960s and early 1970s, including Jerry Butler, Wilson Pickett and Dusty Springfield. They also produced the Jacksons' first two albums for Epic/CBS after the group had left Motown in 1976. The first, titled The Jacksons, featured the platinum-selling single "Enjoy Yourself", and a second album, Goin' Places, followed in 1977. Although on CBS subsidiary Epic, both albums and the singles also carried a Philadelphia International logo.

In 1965, Gamble and Huff started an independent label, Excel Records. It was soon renamed Gamble Records and in 1972, was folded into Philadelphia International as a subsidiary. In 1974, the subsidiary's name was changed to TSOP Records, taken from the title of the 1974 hit single "TSOP (The Sound of Philadelphia". Artists for Excel/Gamble/TSOP included Dee Dee Sharp, Archie Bell & the Drells and the People's Choice, who had a top 10 single on TSOP in 1976 with "Do It Any Way You Wanna". Later signings to the Philly International roster in the 1980s and 1990s included Patti LaBelle, the Stylistics, Phyllis Hyman and the Dells.

Between 1973 and 1975, Gamble and Huff also distributed a boutique label called Golden Fleece, set up by musicians Norman Harris, Ronnie Baker and Earl Young, which released the second album by the Trammps.  Gamble and Huff also launched a short-lived subsidiary called Thunder Records. Created by Thom Bell, it only had two singles: Derek & Cyndi's "You Bring Out the Best in Me/I'll Do the Impossible for You", which was produced by Bell, and Fatback Band member Michael Walker's "I Got the Notion, You Got the Motion", produced by his brother and Spinners member Philippe Wynne.

Later period
By the mid-1980s, Philadelphia International Records had ended the distribution deal that they had with Columbia. The label was soon after picked up by Capitol/EMI Records. They continued to make hits, including Shirley Jones' "Do You Get Enough Love", but their most successful years were behind them.

In the 1990s, Philadelphia International launched a new subsidiary, Uncensored Records. Featuring Damon and No Question, the label releases hip hop music. Philadelphia International now largely concentrates on licensing its music catalog worldwide and has issued few new recordings since the mid-1980s when Gamble and Huff wound down their studio work together.

In 1989, Gamble and Huff were awarded their first Grammy Award. Simply Red's cover of "If You Don't Know Me By Now", written by Gamble and Huff, won the Grammy Award for Best R&B Song. In 1999, Gamble and Huff were awarded the Lifetime Achievement Grammy from the National Academy of Recording Arts and Sciences. In 2008, the duo was inducted in the Rock and Roll Hall of Fame in the non-performer category, joining their band the O'Jays, who were inducted in 2005.

In November 2009, PBS aired a two-part special, Love Train: The Sound of Philadelphia, that focuses on Gamble and Huff and the family of Philadelphia International Records artists. The concert was shot before a live audience on June 7, 2008 at the Borgata Hotel and Casino in Atlantic City, and showcased TSOP artists.

In February 2010, fire swept through parts of the offices on Philadelphia's Broad Street. The building was previously the home of another iconic part of the city's musical heritage, Cameo-Parkway Records, based there during the 1950s and 1960s, and has become a tourist attraction. The fire was started deliberately by a man who had broken into the offices while so intoxicated by alcohol that he had no later recollection of the crime.

In August 2011, in honor of the 40th anniversary of the company, Philadelphia International Records launched TSOP Soul Radio, an online radio station that airs music and interviews from the Gamble and Huff catalog.

The building that housed Philadelphia International Records located on Broad and Spruce Streets was damaged by arson in 2010 and was effectively shut down. It was sold to local developer Dranoff Properties in 2014. On April 18, 2015, demolition started on the building. Dranoff Properties announced plans to build an SLS International Hotel at the site of the building.

Gamble and Huff have written more than 3,000 songs throughout their careers, making them two of the most efficient and productive songwriters of all time. They continue to write songs together from their homes in South Philadelphia.

Philly soul 
Philadelphia soul, or Philly soul, is a form of soul music that emanated from Philadelphia during the mid-1960s. It provided a smoother alternative to the deep soul of the 1960s while maintaining the soul and emotion of popular R&B of the time. Philadelphia International Records was one of the most successful labels to capitalize on this new genre with acts such as the O'Jays and Teddy Pendergrass.

Philly soul is known for its incorporation of lush string arrangements along with penetrating brass, and often tells very personal and emotional stories. The world-renowned Philadelphia Orchestra's string section was often employed to play on many of Philadelphia International Records' tracks. Philly soul is often considered a producer's genre, the essence of the genre coming mostly from Gamble, Huff, Bell, and the other producers within PIR. Philly soul, with its driving rhythms, later became an inspiration for the disco craze of the 1970s.

Discography
Catalog numbers from 1971 to 1985 are part of CBS Records' overall numbering system, and therefore are discontinuous. Albums released from 1986-1990 were part of Capitol/EMI catalog numbering system. Catalog numbers for albums released after 1991 are from Philadelphia International's distribution deal with Zoo Entertainment.

References

External links 
 SoundOfPhiladelphia.com
 Gamble-Huff Music
 Kenny Gamble interview by Pete Lewis, 'Blues & Soul' December 2011
 Leon Huff Audio Interview, Soulinterviews.com 2012
 Love Train: The Sound of Philadelphia, audio feature on the Philly Sound, Jan 31, 2009.
 Keith Phipps: Philadelphia Soul, avclub.com.
 Nate Patrin: Philadelphia International Records, pitchfork.com.
 NAMM Oral History Interview with Bobby Martin March 9, 2011

American record labels
Record labels established in 1971
 
 
Soul music record labels